The 2014 Auensteiner-Radsporttage will be the inaugural edition of the Auensteiner-Radsporttage, a women's cycling stage race in Germany. It was rated by the UCI as category 2.2.

Stages

Stage 1
31 May 2014 – Ilsfeld to Ilsfeld,  (ITT)

Stage 2
1 June 2014 – Auenstein to Auenstein,

Classification leadership table

See also
 2014 in women's road cycling

References

Auensteiner
Auensteiner
Women's road bicycle races